St. Bernard's can refer to:

St. Bernard's, Newfoundland and Labrador, Canada.
St. Bernard's College, Lower Hutt, New Zealand.
St. Bernard's College, Melbourne, Australia.
St. Bernard's College, Oxford, England, a former Cistercian house of study out of which St John's College, Oxford, developed.
St Bernard's Hospital, a psychiatric hospital in Southall, Middlesex, United Kingdom, situated on the site of the old Hanwell Asylum.
St. Bernard's School, New York, USA
St. Bernard's School (Brantford), Ontario, Canada
St Bernard's Catholic Grammar School, Slough, United Kingdom
St Bernard's Catholic School, Buckinghamshire, now St Michael's Catholic School, High Wycombe, Buckinghamshire, United Kingdom
St Bernard's F.C. former Scottish football club.
Saint Bernard's High School (Saint Paul, Minnesota), a high school in St Paul, Minnesota, USA.

See also
St. Bernard (disambiguation)
St. Bernard's School (disambiguation)